The Firearms Act of Jamaica regulates the ownership and use of firearms and ammunition.  It was first passed in 1967, and has been subsequently amended.  The law requires gun licenses, with a yearly registration fee of JM$12,000.00 (US$ ).  There were about 65,000 licensed firearms in Jamaica in 2002, and approximately seven hundred licenses approved per year.  All crimes involving firearms are tried by a special Gun Court established in 1975.

See also
Gun politics in Jamaica

References

External links
Firearm Licensing Authority
The Firearms Act, full text from the Firearm Licensing Authority

Gun politics in Jamaica
Law of Jamaica
Firearm laws